Eusebio Bava (6 August 1790 in Vercelli – 30 April 1854 in Torino) was an Italian general who fought in the First Italian War of Independence.

Biography
Born at Vercelli, Bava fought as a volunteer under Napoleonic French flag against Prussia in 1806. He took part in the French campaigns in Spain and Portugal, and was captured by the British at Porto in 1809. After Napoleon's abdication, Bava returned to Piedmont where king Victor Emmanuel I integrated  his troops in the Piedmontese army as the Cacciatori piemontesi battalion. In 1838, he was appointed as commander of the Turin division and two years later promoted to lieutenant general.

During the First Italian War of Independence, general Bava commanded one of the two corps of the Piedmonese-Sardinian army under Charles Albert when the latter attacked Austria in Lombardy; however, after the successful Five Days of Milan, the Piedmontese army did not attack the retreating Austrian forces at their most vulnerable point and only followed them up to the Mincio river. Despite this, he won the first success of the war at Pastrengo, and later suggested a plan to draw the enemy to battle; however, the plan was adopted with heavy modifications, which led to the defeat at Santa Lucia. Despite the war going relatively well, the relationships between Bava and the rest of the leading commanders (the king himself, his Minister of War Antonio Franzini, Ettore Gerbaix De Sonnaz, etc.,) became strained, as Charles Albert did not provide his commanders with a firm hand, and the animosity between his counselours made an effective command action very difficult; Bava's own short temper did not help in this regard.

When Josef Radetzky took the offensive, defeating the Tuscan division at Curtatone and Montanara, Bava managed to check his advance with the victory at Goito; however, this was not followed through yet again, and the Piedmontese command was lulled into inaction. This delay gave Radetzky a chance to resume his offensive, defeating the Piedmontese at Custoza and force them back to Lombardy; Although the Piedmontese army had still kept its cohesion, Bava was convinced that the campaign had been lost and remained bent on leading it back to Piedmont.

After an armistice was signed on 9 August, Bava, believing that King Charles Albert had proved himself as an unequal commander in chief, remained de facto the head of the Piedmontese army, and was duly named Generale in Capo (General in Chief) on October 22. However, when Wojciech Chrzanowski was appointed by the King as the army's Chief of Staff, Bava, seeing this as yet another sign of the King's meddling in the army, and seen by a portion of the public opinion as responsible for the unsuccessful campaign, published a scathing report on it to exonerate himself and declaring that Charles Albert's indecision had been the biggest factor in the defeat. This led to the King and the government to agree on Bava's dismissal, and on 16 February 1849 he was formally removed from his position, replaced by Chrzanowski (albeit ambiguously as Charles Albert's chief of staff).

Appointed Senator since 1848, Eusebio Bava died in Turin in 1854.

Assessment
Italian military historian Piero Pieri observed about Bava that, despite his flaws, he was the best army commander available to Sardinia-Piedmont during the Risorgimento.

Sources
Page at Dizionario Biografico degli Italiani 
 Piero Pieri, Storia Militare del Risorgimento, 1962, Giulio Einaudi Editore, Torino

1790 births
1854 deaths
People from Vercelli
Italian generals
People of the First Italian War of Independence